Maryang-ri Camellia Forest (hangul:마량리 동백나무 숲) is a colony of camellia plant located in Maryang-ri, Seocheon-gun, Chungcheongnam-do.
It is one of the 8 Scenic Spots of Seocheon (서천팔경:舒川八景) and was designated as Natural Monument No.169 in 1965.
There are about 85 aerials of camellia trees over 500 years old in this area and has a dense forest of 8,265 m2.

Located in Maryang-ri, the forest is situated on a low hill about 4.5 kilometers away from the coast of Seodo Elementary School.
At the top of the hill there is a small pavilion called Dongbaekjeong. 'Dongbaekjeong' means a pavilion with camellia blossoms.
From late March to early May, you can enjoy the camellia blossom from here.
The scenery of the West Sea in the 'Dongbaekjeong' is beautiful.
Especially, there is an 'Oryeokdo' island in the front of the pavilion, and the scenery of the island and the sea looks great.
The western forest of Maryang-ri has a strong wind, and there are only a few left. About 70 trees are distributed in the east of the forest.
The camellia tree, members of the tea family, is a warm temperate zone evergreen tree that grows up to seven meters tall.
However, the camellia tree here is about two meters tall, and is spread by the strong wind.

The forest is one of a handful of camellia forest in South Korea.
Also, the area is visited by many tourists because of its geographical characteristics, which can be seen sunrise and sunset in one place.
During the year end and New Year's, the festival is held at Maryang Port, and various events such as Si-nangsong(poetry recitation), fireworks, and balloons are held.

On the opposite side of the Maryang-ri Camellia Forest, there is a Seocheon Thermal Power Plant. 
It is the first plant in South Chungcheong Province, constructed in Chungcheongnam-do in 1984.
And the generating capacity of the thermoelectric power plant is 400,000 kW.

Relevant legends
According to the legend, a general who managed to Maryang Port had dreams about 500 years ago. 
He received an oracle in the dream. "If you go to the beach, you'll find a bunch of flowers. If you propagate a lot of flowers, the village thrives." When he went to the beach, there was a flower and it was said that he planted it in the village.

After that, the villagers gather here in January of the lunar calendar to pray for a plentiful harvest of fish, and to pray that it is safe from the sea.

See also
 Sinseong-ri Reed Field
 Natural monuments of South Korea

References

External links
 Seocheon County website 
 Seocheon County website 

Seocheon County